Dōshikai may refer to:

Dōshikai (1960–62), a defunct political party in Japan
Ekirakukai, a defunct political party in Japan originally known as Dōshikai
Rikken Dōshikai, a defunct political party in Japan